The Taipei Bus Station is a multi-use complex located next to Taipei Station in Datong District, Taipei, Taiwan. The complex houses the Taipei bus terminal station provided a number of intercity express bus routes which was inaugurated on 19 August 2009, as well as recreational and leisure facilities. The mall complex was inaugurated on 11 December 2009. The shopping mall part is called Qsquare.

Facilities

Intercity bus routes
 United Bus (UBus)
 1610:Taipei－Kaohsiung
 1611:Taipei－Tainan
 1613:Taipei－Pingtung
 1615:Taipei－Changhua
 1616:Taipei－Yuanlin
 1617:Taipei－Fengyuan—Dongshi District, Taichung
 1618:Taipei－Chiayi
 1619:Taipei－Chaoma—Taichung
 1620:Taipei－Hsinchu—Shuinan—Taichung
 1628:Taipei－Madou－Jali
 1629:Taipei－Syuejia, Linziliao
 1630:Taipei－Xigang
 1631:Taipei－Ershuei－Zhushan
 1632:Taipei－Ciaotun－Zhushan
 1633:Taipei－Beigang－Santiaolun
 1635:Taipei－Huwuei－Santiaolun
 1636:Taipei－Siluo－Syhu－Santiaolun
 1637:Taipei－Siluo－Lincuoliao－Santiaolun
 1638:Taipei－Puzi－Dongshi Township, Chiayi
 1639:Taipei－Budai
 1652:Taipei－Lugang－Fanyuan
 Kuo-Kuang Bus
 1820:Taipei－Lonntan－Zhudon
 1821:Taipei－Yuanshulin－Lonntan－Zhudon
 1822:Taipei－Hsinchu
 1823:Taipei－Zhunan
 1824:Taipei－Highway No.1－Miaoli
 1825:Taipei－Highway No.3－Miaoli
 1826:Taipei－Shuinan－Taichung
 1827:Taipei－Chaoma－Taichung
 1828:Taipei－Changhua
 1829:Taipei－Yuanlin
 1830:Taipei－Beidou
 1831:Taipei－Nantou
 1832:Taipei－Puli
 1833:Taipei－Sun Moon Lake
 1834:Taipei－Chiayi
 1835:Taipei－Chiayi－Alishan
 1836:Taipei－Chiayi－Xinying
 1837:Taipei－Tainan
 1838:Taipei－Kaohsiung
 1839:Taipei－Pingtung
 Howtai Bus
 2011:Taipei－Hsinchu
 2012:Taipei－Xinfong
 Ho-Hsin bus
 7500:Taipei－Chaoma－Xinying－Tainan
 Aloha Bus
 3888:Taipei－Chaoma－Chiayi
 3999:Taipei－Chaoma－Kaohsiung
 KML BUS
 1915:(Banqiao－)Taipei－FuXing S. Rd.－Jiaoxi－Yilan－Luodong
 1915:(Banqiao－)Taipei－HuanDong Blvd.－Jiaoxi－Yilan－Luodong
 1916:(Banqiao－)Taipei－FuXing S. Rd.－Yilan
 1917:(Banqiao－)Taipei－FuXing S. Rd.－Luodong
 Fengyuan Bus
 6609:Taipei—Fengyuan
 Hsinchu Bus
 9003:Taipei－Hsinchu

Allowance of bus platforms

Shopping Mall
 Qsquare: Operational area at 20,000 ping. Entrance is at Chengde Rd. Opened on 11 December 2009. Includes Vieshow Cinemas.

Business Hotel
 Palais de Chine

Residential
About 1,000 households provided.

Control Center
 OCC of TRTC(T9 OCC)
 Traffic OCC of Taipei City Hall

Accidents and incidents
On April 19, 2021, a fire broke out at the Palais De Chine hotel and later spread to the adjacent Qsquare shopping mall. Police officers arrived at the scene and found a fire near the outer smoke exhaust duct on the 5th floor. The fire was later extinguished. All 302 people evacuated the building and survived.

See also
 Taipei City Hall Bus Station
 Taipei Station

References

External links

 Taipei Bus Station 
 Jin-Jan i Taipei
 日勝生活科技

2009 establishments in Taiwan
Buildings and structures in Taipei
Bus stations in Taiwan
Transportation in Taipei
Transport infrastructure completed in 2009